In the area of modern algebra known as group theory, the McLaughlin group McL is a sporadic simple group of order
   27 ⋅ 36 ⋅ 53 ⋅ 7 ⋅ 11 = 898,128,000
 ≈ 9.

History and properties
Its Schur multiplier has order 3, and its outer automorphism group has order 2. The group 3.McL:2 is a maximal subgroup of the Lyons group.

McL has one conjugacy class of involution (element of order 2), whose centralizer is a maximal subgroup of type 2.A8. This has a center of order 2; the quotient modulo the center is isomorphic to the alternating group A8.

Representations
In the Conway group Co3, McL has the normalizer McL:2, which is maximal in Co3.

McL has 2 classes of maximal subgroups isomorphic to the Mathieu group M22. An outer automorphism interchanges the two classes of M22 groups. This outer automorphism is realized on McL embedded as a subgroup of Co3.

A convenient representation of M22 is in permutation matrices on the last 22 coordinates; it fixes a 2-2-3 triangle with vertices the origin and the type 2 points  and '. The triangle's edge  is type 3; it is fixed by a Co3. This M22 is the monomial, and a maximal, subgroup of a representation of McL.

 (p. 207) shows that the subgroup McL is well-defined. Count the type 2 points w such that the inner product v·w = 3 (and thus v-w is type 2).

|McL| = |Co3|/552 = 898,128,000.

McL is the only sporadic group to admit irreducible representations of quaternionic type. It has 2 such representations, one of dimension 3520 and one of dimension 4752.

Maximal subgroups
 found the 12 conjugacy classes of maximal subgroups of McL as follows:

 U4(3) order 3,265,920 index 275 – point stabilizer of its action on the McLaughlin graph
 M22 order 443,520 index 2,025 (two classes, fused under an outer automorphism)
 U3(5) order  126,000  index 7,128	
 31+4:2.S5 order 58,320 index  15,400	
 34:M10 order 58,320 index 15,400	
 L3(4):22  order 40,320 index 22,275	
 2.A8  order 40,320 index  22,275 – centralizer of involution
 24:A7 order 40,320 index 22,275 (two classes, fused under an outer automorphism)
 M11 order 7,920 index 113,400	
 5+1+2:3:8 order 3,000 index 299,376

Conjugacy classes
Traces of matrices in a standard 24-dimensional representation of McL are shown.  The names of conjugacy classes are taken from the Atlas of Finite Group Representations.

Cycle structures in the rank 3 permutation representation, degree 275, of McL are shown.

Generalized Monstrous Moonshine

Conway and Norton suggested in their 1979 paper that monstrous moonshine is not limited to the monster. Larissa Queen and others subsequently found that one can construct the expansions of many Hauptmoduln from simple combinations of dimensions of sporadic groups.

References

 Conway, J. H.; Curtis, R. T.; Norton, S. P.; Parker, R. A.; and Wilson, R. A.: "Atlas of Finite Groups: Maximal Subgroups and Ordinary Characters for Simple Groups."  Oxford, England 1985.

External links
 MathWorld: McLaughlin group
  Atlas of Finite Group Representations: McLaughlin group

Sporadic groups